Among the Tungusic peoples of Siberia, Hinkon was the god of hunting and of animal life.

References 

Tungusic mythology
Hunting gods
Animal gods